Cassia javanica, also known as Java cassia, pink shower, apple blossom tree and rainbow shower tree (Filipino: balayong), is a species of tree in the family Fabaceae. Its origin is in Southeast Asia, but it has been extensively grown in tropical areas worldwide as a garden tree owing to its beautiful crimson and pink flower bunches.

Description

Cassia javanica is a fast growing, deciduous / semi-deciduous tree which flowers in spring and sheds its leaves in the winter months.
It has a straight trunk that reaches heights of 25 - 40m.
The leaves are paripinnate with 12 pairs of elliptical leaves.
The flowers range in colour from pale pink to crimson with yellow coloured stamens and are found in open clusters. 
The ground under the tree is covered with a beautiful carpet of pink towards the end of the flowering season.
The fruit are housed in long cylindrical dark brown pods.
Because of its beauty and suitable size C. javanica is planted as a shade and ornamental tree on streets and in parks.
C. javanica is polymorphic and several sub species such as those listed below exist.

Range
Cassia javanica originated in Java and Sumatra. Native range of this species is China, Cambodia, Indonesia, Thailand, Malaysia, Myanmar, Mauritius, the Philippines, United States and Pacific Islands. Today it is also commonly found in other places including Bangladesh, India and the Philippines.

Flowering season
In India, C. javanica flowers in April/May and fruits and sheds its leaves in December. In Thailand, C. javanica flowers between Feb and April. In the Philippines, C. nodosa or C. javanica nodosa flowers between February until the summer season. In East Java, C. javanica flowers between October and December and fruits in the dry season.

Cultural importance
Cassia javanica is one of Thailand's Nine Auspicious Trees and is said to bring good luck, ensure continued high rank and afford victory.
Its flower is the provincial flower of Chainat Province, Thailand.

The subspecies native to the Philippines, locally called balayong, is honored through the Balayong Festival in Puerto Princesa, Palawan. The flower is a historical symbol of feminine dominance, female beauty, and love in the language of herbs among the locals.

Uses
It is used medicinally as a substitute to Cassia fistula for treating constipation, colic, chlorosis and urinary disorders.
Its leaves are effective against herpes simplex and the bark of C. javanica is one of the ingredients in ayurvedic and other traditional medicine antidiabetic formulations.
C. javanica yields a lightweight to heavy hardwood that is used for general construction, furniture and cabinet making.
The bark of C. javanica is used for tanning in the leather processing industry.

References

External links

Java Cassia - Flowers of India
Philippines Medicinal Plants
Sai Yok National Park Myanmar
Cassia Javanica Bangalore

javanica
Trees of China
Flora of tropical Asia
Garden plants of Asia
Ornamental trees
Plants described in 1753
Taxa named by Carl Linnaeus